Wayne Earl Shaw is an American politician from the U.S. state of Oklahoma. He represented the 3rd district in the Oklahoma State Senate from 2012 to 2020.

Early life and career
Shaw earned a bachelor of science degree in Secondary Education from Lamar University. Shaw earned a master's degree in Ministry from Lincoln Christian University. After earning his degree in education, Shaw taught at a public school in Arkansas. According to Fox News, he is a retired football referee. He has also served as an adjunct professor at Oklahoma Wesleyan University in Bartlesville, Oklahoma. Shaw is senior pastor of First Christian Church in Grove. Shaw and his wife, Anna have 3 children.

Oklahoma Senate (2012–2020)
Shaw was a Republican member of the Oklahoma State Senate, representing the 3rd district. He was initially elected in November 2011. He served in the 54th Oklahoma Legislature, 55th Oklahoma Legislature, 56th Oklahoma Legislature, and 57th Oklahoma Legislature.

57th Legislature
Shaw sponsored a bill in the state senate (SB 1016) to require that all public schools and buildings in the state should display a framed image or poster containing the national motto "In God We Trust," along with a representation of both the U.S. and Oklahoma flags. The bill specified that the required signage would be funded by donations or funds from voluntary contributions to local schools. Shaw lost the 2020 Republican primary to Blake Stephens.

Electoral history

Notes

References

External links 
 Shaw on Twitter.com

Living people
People from Grove, Oklahoma
Republican Party Oklahoma state senators
Year of birth missing (living people)
Lamar University alumni
Lincoln Christian University alumni
Oklahoma Wesleyan University faculty
21st-century American politicians